Churni Ganguly (née Banerjee) is a Bengali actress and director.

After spending her childhood in Kurseong, she came to Kolkata and got admitted at the Jadavpur University. While studying at Jadavpur University, she joined a theatre group as an actress. Then she moved to Mumbai and acted in a few television serials. Later, she came back to Kolkata and started acting in Bengali films.

Ganguly received the Bengal Film Journalists' Association Awards in 2005 in the best actress category for the movie Waarish, in which she played a single-mother's role.

Personal life 

Churni Ganguly (born Churni Banerjee) spent her childhood in Kurseong. Her parents were school teachers. She was a student of Dow Hills boarding school. In spite of being at boarding school, Churni and few other girls were allowed to stay at their homes with their parents. Churni's father, whom Churni described as "extremely caring, but a rather serious person" encouraged Churni to do well in studies, and especially sports. But Churni did not feel the urge to concentrate on sports. Churni was a good student at school, but she never thought that she had to secure rankings in examinations.

Churni was a student of Jadavpur University. While at university, in 1987, she started a theatre troupe with Suman Mukhopadhyay and her future husband Kaushik Ganguly. Churni is married to Bengali film director Kaushik Ganguly and has a son – Ujaan Ganguly.

Career in Mumbai 
Firstly, she tried her luck in the Hindi film and television industry. She shifted to Mumbai and acted in Zee TV's first daily soap, Raahat and stayed there for the next two years. In those days, when she was in her twenties, she acted in Choti si Asha, in which she played a 35-year-old mother's character who matured to about 60. Later she decided to come back to Kolkata.

Career in Bengali film industry 
After moving to Kolkata, Churni decided to join the Bengali film industry.

2004—2005 
In 2004, Ganguly made her debut in Bengali cinema with the film Waarish. The film was directed by Kaushik Ganguly. In the film, she played the role of a single mother— Medha. Medha was an ex-flame of Subhankar, who became pregnant after a rendezvous with him. Though Medha was not married with Subhankar, she denied abortion and gave birth to a son, Megh. Many years later, when she learns that she is suffering from cancer, she goes to Subhankar, (who was married to another woman at that time) and asks to take responsibility of Megh. Though the acting of Ganguly in this film was widely appreciated, it did not get commercial success.

In 2005, Ganguly acted in the film Shunyo E Buke, directed by Kaushik Ganguly. In this film, she portrayed a flat-chested woman's role and the film attempted to explore male sexual fantasy.

2007—2010 
In 2007, Ganguly acted in Jara Bristite Bhijechhilo, directed by Anjan Das. The film revolved around lesbian relationships.

In 2008, Ganguly acted in Anjan Dutt's Chalo Let's Go. This was Ganguly's first feature film in which she acted under the direction of someone other than Kaushik Ganguly. The film was a travelogue and narrated a story of a journey with nine passengers. Ganguly played the character of Miss Ganguly, a sophisticated writer. But in the film, her fellow passengers used to call her "Miss Gombhir".

In 2009, Ganguly acted in Sakaler Rang, directed by Suvamoy Chattopadhyay.

In the 2010 film Arekti Premer Golpo, Ganguly played the character of Rani/Gopa. In this film, Rituparno Ghosh and Indraneil Sengupta acted in lead roles and the film revolved around a homosexual relationship.

2011—present 

In 2011, Ganguly acted in Rang Milanti, another film directed by Kaushik Ganguly. In this film, she played the role of Kamalini, a successful Television actor. In the same year, Ganguly acted in Ribhu Dasgupta's directorial debut film Michael. In this film, Ganguly played the role of Ria, Naseerudin Shah's wife. Michael was produced by Anurag Kashyap.

In 2012, Ganguly acted in two Bengali movies— Laptop, directed by Kaushik Ganguly and Arjun – Kalimpong E Sitaharan, directed by Prem Modi. The film Laptop told some stories related to some different people, connected by one single laptop. On the other hand, Arjun – Kalimpong E Sitaharan was a detective film based on Samaresh Majumdar's literary character Arjun.

The 2013 film Shabdo, directed by Kaushik Ganguly, was widely appreciated by critics. The story of the film revolved around Tarak, a foley artist of Bengali film industry. In this film, Ganguly played a psychriatist's role.

Ganguly signed Kaushik Ganguly's C/O Sir for the role of Mrs Chatterjee. Later, as she was having problem with dates, she was replaced by another actress Sudipta Chakraborty.

She also acted in Bakita Byaktigato, directed by Pradipta Bhattacharya. This film shot like a documentary, the film traces a man's quest for love as per critics review. Pramit, an amateur documentary filmmaker, is tired of girls rejecting his propositions. Prem ki? Ki kore prem hoye? Troubled by such questions, he takes it upon himself to solve the puzzle anyhow. And this time around, he plans to make a documentary film on love.
 
Actor Churni Ganguly debuts as a director in Nirbashito, a bilingual film in Bengali and English, shot in Kolkata and Sweden.
After many snuffed-out attempts by several filmmakers, for the first time a film on Taslima Nasrin's life was released at the ongoing Mumbai International Film Festival. The film — Nirbashito (Banished) — is inspired by Taslima and her cat, Minu.

In the film directed by Churni Ganguly, Minu is called Baghini (tigress). The author is, however, not named anywhere in the film.
This film won the Best Bengali film award and the sound designer trophy at the 62nd National Film Awards category.

Bengali television career 
Other than working in few Hindi serials such as Raahat, Umeed etc., Ganguly has worked in Bengali television serials such as @Bhalobasha.com, which was directed by Monish Ghosh and produced by Snehasish Chakraborty; Hridayer Chorabali etc. She has acted in Bengali telefilms too. The telefilm Bandhobi was about two college friends (girls) who meet after a long time and remember those days when both of them fell in love with the same man. Bandhobi was directed by Kaushik Ganguly and Chandrayee Ghosh played Ganguly's friend's role. The telefilm Promotion dealt with single parenthood and it was shot in Darjeeling.

Filmography

Direction 

 Nirbashito (2014)
 Tarikh (2019)

Telefilms 

 Roop directed by Ashok Vishwanathan.
 Ushno-tar Jonyo (2010)
 A...tithi
 Bhalobashar Kotha (directed by Anjan Dutt)
 Chhoti Si Asha
 Bandhobi: (2010) The telefim was about two college friends (roles played by Churni Ganguly and Chandreyi Ghosh).
 Ambor Sen Antardhan Rahasya (1999) as Churni Chatterjee .
 Promotion: This telefilm was entirely shot in Darjeeling and dealt with single parenthood.
 Shesh Kriya (1984)

TV serials 

 Raahat for Zee TV.
 Umeed for Zee TV.
 @Bhalobasha.com (Star Jalsha)
 Chhoti si Asha.
 Bandhan (Star Jalsha)
 Hridayer chorabali (Zee Bangla)
 Debi (Zee Bangla)

Awards 

 2005 Bengal Film Journalists' Association Awards in best actress category for the film Waarish
 Onida Pinnacle Award for Best Actress at the national level
 Kalakar Awards.
 2015 Nirbashito won the Best Bengali film award and the sound designer trophy at the 62nd National Award category director Churni Ganguli

References

External links 

 

Actresses from Kolkata
Living people
Jadavpur University alumni
Bengali television actresses
Bengal Film Journalists' Association Award winners
Kalakar Awards winners
Indian film actresses
Indian television actresses
21st-century Indian actresses
Year of birth missing (living people)
Best Dialogue National Film Award winners
Film directors from Kolkata